Fred Mannix Jr. (born 1984) is a Canadian polo player.

He grew up in Calgary, the son of billionaire businessman Fred Mannix.

Mannix is the highest ranked Canadian polo player on the world polo tour. He is the first Canadian in 65 years to take part in all three legs of Polo's Triple Crown, and believed to be only the second Canadian to play in the Argentine Open.

References

Living people
Canadian polo players
1980s births
Fred Jr.